Lake Effect may refer to:
 Lake-effect snow, a weather phenomenon commonly produced in cool atmospheric conditions
 Lake Effect (journal), an American literary journal
 Lake Effect (film), a horror film directed by Sam Qualiana